Romantic Guide to Lost Places is a 2020 Italian-American drama film, co-written and directed by Giorgia Farina.

Cast

 Clive Owen (dubbed by Fabio Boccanera) as Benno
 Jasmine Trinca as Allegra
 Irène Jacob as Brigitte
 Andrea Carpenzano as Michele
 Edoardo Gabbriellini as Cristian
 Valentin Oudin

Release
The film was presented as a special event in the Venice Days section of the 77th Venice International Film Festival on September 8, 2020, and released theatrically in Italy on September 24 of the same year.

Accolades
 2020 – Venice Film Festival
 Fred Award to Jasmine Trinca

References

External links 

Guida romantica a posti perduti, on CineDataBase, Rivista del cinematografo

2020 films
2020 drama films
Italian drama films
American drama films
Films set in Rome
Films set in the United Kingdom
Italian drama road movies
Films shot in Rome
Films about alcoholism
2020s Italian-language films
2020s American films